Deluxe EP, also known as Rockferry (Deluxe) – EP, is a 2009 extended play (EP) by Welsh singer Duffy, released in the United States. A custom EP containing tracks from the deluxe edition of her internationally successful debut studio album, Rockferry, it was released solely by Duffy's US label Mercury Records instead of the deluxe edition that was released in several other markets. It includes the singles "Mercy" and "Rain on Your Parade".

Track listing
The track listing is almost identical to that of Rockferry: Deluxe Edition disc two, except with the addition of "Mercy" and the absence of "Oh Boy".

Release history

References

External links

Deluxe EP at Discogs
Deluxe EP at Rolling Stone

2009 EPs
Duffy (singer) EPs